Sir John Fearns Nicoll  (26 April 1899 – 12 January 1981) was a British colonial administrator who served as Governor of Singapore  from 1952 to 1955.

Early years and colonial service
Nicoll was born in 1899 and attended Carlisle Grammar School, Pembroke College, Oxford and University of Oxford and embarked on a colonial career in British Protectorate of North Borneo in 1921.

Nicoll became Deputy Colonial Secretary of the British Crown Colony Trinidad and Tobago in 1937, the Colonial Secretary of the British Colony of Fiji from 1944 to 1949. During this time, he served as Acting Governor twice, in 1944 and 1947. This was followed by his appointment as administrator and Colonial Secretary of Hong Kong in 1949.

Nicoll became Governor of Singapore in 1952 and was present during the 1954 National Service riots and left the Governorship the following year. Nicoll retired from the Colonial Service and returned to Britain.

Awards and honours
Nicoll was invested as Companion of the Order of St Michael and St George (CMG) in the 1946 New Year Honours and was promoted to Knight Commander of the Order of St Michael and St George (KCMG) in 1953 New Year Honours.

He was knighted with Order of the Hospital of Saint John of Jerusalem (KStJ) in 1952.

Personal
Nicoll was married to Irene and had one son, Anthony Nicoll.

Nicoll died on 12 January 1981 at Scio House Hospital, Putney Heath, United Kingdom.

Legacy
Nicoll Highway was named in his honour and a portrait of Nicoll by Elliott & Fry hangs in the National Portrait Gallery.

References

External links

1899 births
1981 deaths
People educated at Carlisle Grammar School
British Hong Kong
Administrators in British Singapore
British North Borneo
Political office-holders in Trinidad and Tobago
British expatriates in Fiji
British expatriates in Trinidad and Tobago
Governors of the Straits Settlements